The 2003–04 Argentine Primera División was the 113th season of top-flight football in Argentina. The season ran from 3 August 2003 to 27 June 2004. Atlético de Rafaela (champion of 2002–03 Primera B Nacional) and Quilmes (which earned it after beating Argentinos Juniors in a two-legged series) were promoted from Primera B Nacional.

Boca Juniors won the Apertura (league title 26th.) and River Plate the Clausura (34th. title) championships, while four teams were relegated, Chacarita Juniors, Nueva Chicago (the last two teams in average table) plus Atlético de Rafaela and Talleres de Córdoba (which lost the promotion playoffs)

Torneo Apertura

Final standings

Top scorers

Torneo Clausura

Final standings

Top scorers

Relegation

Relegation table

Promotion playoff

Atlético de Rafaela and Talleres de Córdoba were relegated to Primera B Nacional.

See also
2003–04 in Argentine football

References

Argentine Primera División seasons
Primera Division